Major General Peter John Talleri retired in September, 2013, after serving 34 years in the United States Marine Corps.  At retirement, Maj. Gen. Talleri was the U. S. Marine Corps senior logistics professional in the Pacific.   In 2013, he was also a recipient of the National Safety Council's “CEOs Who Get It” award.

Early life 
Talleri was born in Butler, Pennsylvania in 1957.  He is the oldest of four children to native Pennsylvania parents.

Marine Corps Career 
Talleri entered the United States Marine Corps in 1979 as a Second Lieutenant. During his military career, Major General Talleri commanded and led logistics units from the platoon to national level; across the full range of combat and joint operational capabilities.  He also held critical staff positions at the U. S. Central Command (CENTCOM) and the United States Marine Forces Central Command. While at CENTCOM, he was responsible for the information technology logistical planning efforts during Operation Iraqi Freedom and Operation Enduring Freedom. This included providing operational plans to ensure that total asset visibility was accomplished during the war. Operation Iraqi Freedom was the first time "Active RFID" was used on a strategic scale.

Private Sector Career 
Talleri is currently President at Peter J. Talleri & Associates, and a strategic advisor with Stellar Solutions, HDT Global, and BlackBerry. He is also on the board of directors at the Clarion University Foundation, Airborne Motorworks and DiviUp.

Education 
Talleri is a 1975 graduate of Butler Area Senior High School. He received his bachelor's degree in business management from Clarion State College in Clarion, PA in 1979 and is currently a member of the Clarion University Foundation Board.  Talleri earned his first master's degree in business management from Florida Institute of Technology in Melbourne, Florida in 1994.  He earned another master's degree in national resource strategy from the Industrial College of the Armed Forces in Washington D.C. in 2001.

Awards 
Maj. Gen. Talleri has earned the Navy Distinguished Service Medal, the Defense Superior Service Medal (two awards), the Legion of Merit (two awards), the Defense Meritorious Service Medal, the Meritorious Service Medal (three awards), the Navy and Marine Corps Commendation Medal (three awards), the Joint Service Achievement Medal, the Navy and Marine Corps Achievement Medal, the Iraq Campaign Medal, the Armed Forces Expeditionary Medal, the Humanitarian Service Medal, the Afghanistan Campaign Medal, the National Defense Service Medal with bronze star, the Global War on Terrorism Expeditionary Medal with bronze star, the Global War on Terrorism Service Medal, the Joint Meritorious Unit Award, the Navy Meritorious Unit Commendation, the Navy Unit Commendation, the Sea Service Deployment Ribbon, the Navy and Marine Corps Overseas Service Ribbon, the Korean Defense Service Medal, and the Marine Corps Recruiting Service Ribbon.   In 2008, the Clarion University Alumni Association presented him with the Distinguished Achievement Award.

  Navy Distinguished Service Medal
  Defense Superior Service Medal with Gold Star
  Legion of Merit with Gold Star
  Defense Meritorious Service Medal
  Meritorious Service Medal with two Gold Stars
  Navy and Marine Corps Commendation Medal with two Gold Stars
  Joint Service Achievement Medal
  Navy and Marine Corps Achievement Medal
  National Defense Service Medal with bronze star
  Iraq Campaign Medal
|  Armed Forces Expeditionary Medal
  Humanitarian Service Medal
  Afghanistan Campaign Medal
  Global War on Terrorism Expeditionary Medal
  Global War on Terrorism Service Medal
  Joint Meritorious Unit Award
  Navy Unit Commendation 
  Navy Sea Service Deployment Ribbon with eight stars
  Navy and Marine Corps Overseas Service Ribbon
  Marine Corps Recruiting Ribbon
  Korea Defense Service Medal
  Navy Meritorious Unit Commendation

References 

1957 births
Living people
People from Butler, Pennsylvania
Clarion University of Pennsylvania alumni
Florida Institute of Technology alumni
Dwight D. Eisenhower School for National Security and Resource Strategy alumni
Recipients of the Legion of Merit
United States Marine Corps generals
Recipients of the Defense Superior Service Medal
Recipients of the Navy Distinguished Service Medal